Sycamore Valley is an unincorporated community in northern Bethel Township, Monroe County, Ohio, United States.  It has a post office with the ZIP code 43789.

References

Unincorporated communities in Ohio
Unincorporated communities in Monroe County, Ohio